A layer cake is a pastry made from stacked layers of cake held together by filling.

Layer Cake or layer cake may also refer to:
 In mathematics, the Layer cake representation is a representation of a function in terms of an integral of 'slices' of the function's area
 Layer-cake federalism, is a political arrangement in which power is divided between a federal and state governments in clearly defined terms
 Layer Cake (novel), a 2000 novel by J. J. Connolly
 Layer Cake (film), a 2004 film based on the novel
 Layer Cake, Soviet Sloika design for nuclear-weapon test Joe 4
 Layer Cake, digital music imprint of Dreamlab (production team)
 "Layer Cake", song by Kano (rapper) inspired by the film Layer Cake